Pululuya River is a river located in the southern part of the Sonsonate Department of El Salvador.  Precipitations along the river are suitable for municipal water, irrigation, and water wells.

References

Rivers of El Salvador
Sonsonate Department